Matt Drinkall is an American football coach currently serving as the tight ends coach with the Army Black Knights of the United States Military Academy. He is currently in his second year on staff, having spent the 2019 season as an offensive quality control coach.

He previously served as the head football coach of Kansas Wesleyan University in Salina, Kansas, starting in January 2014.  He had worked previously as a football coach at the high school and college levels before being hired as head coach. In 2015, Drinkall was the second-youngest head college football coach in the country behind Cornell's David Archer and took the Coyotes to the 2015 playoffs.

On January 14, 2019, Drinkall announced his resignation of the head coaching position at Kansas Wesleyan to join the staff of the Army Black Knights as an offensive quality control coach. He had compiled a 42–17 record as head coach.

Head coaching record

References

External links
 Army profile

Year of birth missing (living people)
Living people
Army Black Knights football coaches
Kansas Wesleyan Coyotes football coaches
St. Ambrose Fighting Bees football coaches
Western Illinois Leathernecks football coaches
High school football coaches in Iowa
Western Illinois University alumni
People from Bettendorf, Iowa
Sportspeople from Iowa